Xylophanes porioni is a moth of the  family Sphingidae. It is known from Peru.

The length of the forewings is 39–40 mm. It is distinguishable from all other Xylophanes species by the combination of the broad, compact shape of the wings, the suffused brown pattern of the forewing upperside and the arrangement of spots forming the median band of the hindwing upperside. The ground colour of the upperside of the body and forewings is reddish brown. The forewing upperside is similar in general appearance to that of Xylophanes rufescens, but the pattern of lines and spots is more contrasting. The first postmedian line is diffuse, running to the costa rather than the apex. The second and third postmedian lines are weakly developed, also running to the costa and below the fourth postmedian line it is replaced by vein dots, or it is represented only by a row of vein dots. The median band of the hindwing upperside consists of a series of off-white triangular spots that increase in size from the apex towards the anal angle.

References

porioni
Moths described in 2000
Endemic fauna of Peru
Moths of South America